Mariana Seoane (born Mariana Alejandra Seoane García on June 10, 1976 in Mexico City, Mexico) is a Mexican actress, model and singer.

Biography
Seoane was born June 10, 1976, from an Argentinian mother and a Cuban-Mexican father, Seoane demonstrated an interest in becoming an entertainer since a very early age. She began acting and singing professionally as a teenager. It is the former career, however, that has brought her much fame in Mexico and Latin America.

In 1995, Seoane made her acting debut on a Televisa telenovela, when she appeared on Retrato de Familia ("Family Photo"), alongside Alfredo Adame, Helena Rojo and Julio Bracho. Seoane played Aracely in Retrato de Familia. During 1996, Seoane played Sandra in Los Hijos de Nadie ("Nobody's Children"), where she acted with Puerto Rican Osvaldo Ríos.

Seoane then acted in Cancion de Amor ("Love Song"), a telenovela geared towards teenagers and young adults. In it, she shared credits with young actors like Eduardo Capetillo, Jorge Salinas and Mauricio Islas, as well as with veterans such as Joaquín Cordero, Guillermo García Cantú, Lorena Rojas and Jaime Garza. Seoane played Roxana in Cancion de Amor.

Seoane continued on with her acting career in 1997, when she filmed Mi Pequeña Traviesa ("My Little Daredevil"), with Anahí, Rafael Inclan, Enrique Rocha and future spouses Hector Soberon and Michelle Vieth. Having given life to the character of Bárbara in that telenovela, Seoane then proceeded to take a two-year lay-off from telenovelas after that. But she returned in 1999, when she had her first opportunity of starring in a telenovela, acting as Adriana in Amor Gitano ("Gypsy Love"), where Islas was her co-star.

Seoane also acted in Tres Mujeres ("Three Women") that year, sharing the scene with Laura Flores as well as such up and coming actors as Dominika Paleta, Eduardo Verastegui and future husband and wife Bobby Larios and Niurka Marcos, among others. Seoane played Marcela Duran in Tres Mujeres.

After a two-year hiatus from television, Seoane returned in 2001, making her comedy debut in Diseñador, Ambos Sexos ("Designer of both Sexes") a comedy about a fashion designer who pretended to be homosexual in order to get close to women. Seoane played Ernestina Soto in Atrévete a Olvidarme ("Dare to Forget Me"), a telenovela which was also run during 2001, with Jorge Salinas and Adriana Fonseca as stars. Seoane has made a total of four soap operas where Salinas also acted.

In 2003, Seoane was offered her second starring role on a telenovela, when she participated as Rebeca Linares in Venevision's production, Rebeca. Seoane then recorded her first CD, which was released during 2004. Sere Una Niña Buena ("I'll be a Good Girl"), her first discographic production, became a mild success in Seoane's show business career. It peaked at number 42 in the Top Latin Album in Billboard and her first single peaked at number 18 in the Hot Latin Tracks. Que no me faltes tu was her second single, which was successful, it peaked number 6 in the Hot Latin Tracks.

Her second album was released in 2005, La nina buena ("The Good Girl"), it peaked number 38 in the Top Latin Albums in Billboard and the first single, Una de dos, reached number 22 in the Hot Latin Track; her second single was No vuelvo mas, which peaked 42 in the Hot Latin Tracks. In 2006 she released Con Sabor a... Mariana; the first single of this album was Mermelada. This album was less successful than the two previous albums. Her latest album was recorded in 2007, titled Mariana esta de fiesta... atrevete, and the single was Atrevete. In 2010 she released a new song "Loca" for telenovela Mar de Amor. In 2012 Mariana released her fifth album La Malquerida with singles "La Malquerida" and "Nadie me lo conto".

During 2005, a well known Hispanic gossip magazine in the United States sponsored a contest where winners would get a photo and a copy of the Sere una Niña Buena CD personally autographed by Seoane. Noting that three of the twenty contestants that won the prizes were from Puerto Rico, Seoane made sure to mention that country on her New Year's Eve Univision celebration show's speech.

, Seoane was invited to appear on the famous telenovela, La fea más bella. She appears as Karla, who falls quickly in love with Fernando Mendiola, played by Jaime Camil. In late 2007, Seoane personifies an evil villain in Juan Osorio's telenovela Tormenta en el Paraiso. In November 2009, she starred in Nathalie Lartilleux's telenovela Mar de Amor. In 2012, she starred as Rebecca Oropeza Pérez, the main antagonist in Por ella soy Eva. In 2013, she starred in the telenovela La tempestad as Úrsula Maya, one of the series' main antagonists. In 2014, she played Silvana Blanco, the main female antagonist in the telenovela Hasta el fin del mundo.

In October 2020, She Participated on the Reality Show of the Spanish Version of “The Masked Singer”, ¿Quién es la máscara? on the 2nd Season as a Mouse, and was eliminated on the 1st Episode.

Discography 
 Seré Una Niña Buena (2004)
 La Niña Buena (2005)
 Con Sabor A... Mariana (2006)
 Mariana Esta De Fiesta... Atrévete!!! (2007)
 Que No Me Faltes Tú Y Muchos Éxitos Más (2007)
 La Malquerida (2012)

Filmography

Awards and nominations

Premios Furia Musical

Premio Lo Nuestro 2004

Premios Oye

Latin Grammy Award

Premios People en Español

TVyNovelas Awards

Premios Tu Mundo

References

External links

alma-latina.net

1976 births
Living people
Mexican telenovela actresses
Mexican television actresses
Mexican film actresses
Mexican female models
Actresses from Michoacán
Singers from Michoacán
Universal Music Latin Entertainment artists
Mexican people of Argentine descent
Mexican people of Cuban descent
Mexican people of Galician descent
Mexican vedettes
People from Parácuaro
21st-century Mexican singers
21st-century Mexican women singers
Women in Latin music